While the Secretariat of the United Nations is headquartered in New York City, its many bodies, specialized agencies, and related organizations are headquartered in other parts of the world, particularly in Europe.

Locations

Africa

Americas

Asia

Europe

Statistics

See also 
List of United Nations organizations
United Nations
United Nations System

References

External links 
 Main UN Offices Worldwide
 UN System of Organisations

United Nations properties